"Take Me to Your Heart" is a song by Danish soft rock band Michael Learns to Rock, released as the first single from their 2004 self-titled album. The song is an adaptation of the 1993 Chinese hit "Goodbye Kiss" ("吻别", "Wen Bie") by Hong Kong singer Jacky Cheung which is the title track of the album The Goodbye Kiss.

Track listings

See also
 Danish pop

Charts

References

External links

1993 songs
2004 singles
1990s ballads
Michael Learns to Rock songs
EMI Records singles
Songs written by Jascha Richter